Charles Kidson (7 November 1867–2 October 1908) was a New Zealand art teacher, artist, craftsman and sculptor. He was born in Bilston, Staffordshire, England on 7 November 1867.

He was a leading figure in the Canterbury Arts & Crafts movement along with Leonard Booth and Francis Shurrock.

References

1867 births
1908 deaths
New Zealand educators
People from Bilston
English emigrants to New Zealand
20th-century New Zealand sculptors
20th-century New Zealand male artists
19th-century New Zealand artists
19th-century sculptors